The Bishop of Middlesbrough is the Ordinary of the Roman Catholic Diocese of Middlesbrough in the Province of Liverpool, England.

The see is in the suburb of Coulby Newham in the town of Middlesbrough where the bishop's seat is located at the Cathedral Church of Saint Mary.

The diocese was erected on 20 December 1878 from the Diocese of Beverley. The current bishop is the Right Reverend Terence Drainey, 7th Bishop of Middlesbrough, who was appointed by the Holy See on 17 November 2007 and consecrated on 25 January 2008.

List of the Bishops of the Roman Catholic Diocese of Middlesbrough, England

References